Azada is an adventure-puzzle casual game developed by Big Fish Studios Europe, and distributed by Big Fish Games.

Plot 
Hapless adventurer Titus has been trapped for years in a magical book, for a reason that is only later revealed in the game. With the last of the magical powers he acquired while trapped, Titus transports you, the player, to his study, and asks for your help to get free. The only way he can ever be released from the book is to solve the ancient puzzles of Azada. More of the story is revealed as the player solves new puzzles.

Gameplay 
Azada's main mechanic consists of various puzzles within the same scene, reminiscent of Myst. There are overall ten chapters, and each can be completed only by completing a series of actions. The player must find objects hidden in the room, and then use them together or on other elements around in order to create a chain of actions that ultimately leads to solving the puzzle. For each of the stages, a time limit is given. It is susceptible to penalties in cases when objects are combined wrongly or by using a hint. When it runs out, every puzzle has to be replayed from the start.

Reception 

Azada was nominated in the Downloadable Game of the Year category, for the Interactive Achievement Awards 2008.

Sequels 
Big Fish Studios released a sequel to the game, Azada: Ancient Magic in 2008. In 2011, Azada: In Libro was released, which made few changes to the gameplay. Libro was followed up by Azada: Elementa, where the threat of Titus's uncle has to be destroyed once and for all.

References

External links 
Azada on Big Fish Games

Windows games
MacOS games
2007 video games
Big Fish Games games
Video games developed in France
Nintendo 3DS games
Nintendo 3DS eShop games
Hidden object games
Casual games
Single-player video games